This is a list of songs recorded, sung or written by Skye Sweetnam.

Released songs
This is a chronological list of officially released songs by Canadian singer-songwriter Skye Sweetnam.

2002–2004
 "Billy S."
 "Fallen Through"
 "Heart of Glass"
 "Hypocrite"
 "I Don't Care"
 "I Don't Really Like You"
 "Imaginary Superstar"
 "It Sucks"
 "Number One"
 "Sharada"
 "Shattered"
 "Shot to Pieces"
 "Smoke & Mirrors"
 "Split Personality"
 "Sugar Guitar"
 "Superstar"
 "Tangled Up in Me"
 "Tidal Wave"
 "Too Late"
 "Unpredictable"
 "Wild World"

2007–2008
 "Babydoll Gone Wrong"
 "Boyhunter"
 "Cartoon"
 "Ghosts"
 "Girl Like Me"
 "Human"
 "Kiss a Girl"
 "(Let's Get Movin') Into Action"
 "Make-Out Song"
 "Music Is My Boyfriend"
 "My Favorite Tune"
 "Scary Love"
 "Ultra"
"Where I Want to Be"

Unreleased songs
This is a chronological list of confirmed unreleased songs by singer-songwriter Skye Sweetnam.

"Awakening" (James Robertson, Skye Sweetnam)
 "Blow Your Mind" (James Robertson, Skye Sweetnam) 
 "Creep!" (Skye Sweetnam, Stefy Rae, Jimmy Harry)
 "Follow the Leader" (James Robertson, Skye Sweetnam) 
 "Get Over You" (Alexander Cantrall, Karlin Kenneth, Lindy Robbins, Carsten Schack, Skye Sweetnam) 
 "Give Me Direction" (James Robertson, Skye Sweetnam) 
 "Hitch Hiking" (James Robertson, Skye Sweetnam) 
 "Holes" (James Robertson, Skye Sweetnam) 
 "I Ain't Givin' It Up" (Alexander Cantrall, Karlin Kenneth, Lindy Robbins, Carsten Schack, Skye Sweetnam) 
 "Ice Song" (Skye Sweetnam, James Robertson) 
 "I'm Coming for You" (James Robertson, Skye Sweetnam) 
 "Kingdoms Crumble Down" (James Robertson, Skye Sweetnam) 
 "My Brand New Life" 
 "Party Song" (Ashley Coulter, Michael Fox, Skye Sweetnam) 
 "Peg Legged Pretty aka Captain Sly" (Skye Sweetnam, Matt Drake)
 "Please" (Skye Sweetnam, James Robertson) 
 "Poison the Princess" (James Robertson, Skye Sweetnam) 
 "Rebel Wannabe" (Skye Sweetnam, Matt Drake)
 "Reckless" (Ashley Coulter, Michael Fox, Skye Sweetnam) 
 "Remember Me" (Skye Sweetnam, Lester Mendez) 
 "She's Got That Thing" (James Robertson, Skye Sweetnam) 
 "Sold" (James Robertson, Skye Sweetnam) 
 "Sound Soldier" (James Robertson, Skye Sweetnam) 
 "That Girl in the Mirror" (James Robertson, Skye Sweetnam) 
 "The Great Melody Escape" (James Robertson, Skye Sweetnam) 
 "The Lion's Den" (James Robertson, Skye Sweetnam) 
 "Utopia"
 "Audio Album" (James Robertson, Skye Sweetnam)

Miscellaneous songs

Self-released
 "Boomerang" (YouTube video and MySpace) 
 "Bring It Back" (MySpace)
 "Something Like a Heartbreak" (YouTube video) (James Robertson, Skye Sweetnam)
 "Love Sugar Sweet" (YouTube video) 
 "Musick" (MySpace)
 "Stay" (MySpace) 
 "Wolves & Witches" (James Robertson, Skye Sweetnam)
 "March Of The Sound Soldier"

Soundtrack songs
 "Part of Your World" - DisneyMania 3
 "Part of Your World (C-Girl Rock Remix)" - DisneyRemixMania
 "Cruella DeVil" – DisneyMania 4
 "Why Doesn't Santa Like Me?" – Radio Disney Jingle Jams

Theme songs
 "Fly by the Wayside" – Wayside
 "Just The Way I Am" – The Buzz on Maggie
 "Radio Free Roscoe Theme" – Radio Free Roscoe
 "My Life Me Theme" – My Life Me

Other
 "Girl Most Likely To" – The Barbie Diaries
 "Note to Self" – The Barbie Diaries
 "Lava Rock" – Super Monkey Ball: Step & Roll
 "Real Life" – The Barbie Diaries
 "This Is Me" – The Barbie Diaries

Sumo Cyco
 "LIMP"
 "Mercy"
 "Get Off"
 "Interceptor"
 "Danger"
 "Who Do You Want To Be" - Oingo Boingo Cover
 "Little Drummer boy"
 "Loose Cannon"
 "Where Do We Go"
 "Renegade"
 "Permanent Holiday (Locked in the Trunk of His Car)"
 "The Ugly"
 "Go Go Go"
 "Cry Murder"
 "Fighter"
 "Fuel My Fire"
 "Like A Killer"
 "Brave"
 "We Ride"
 "Crowd Control (Do What We Want)"
 "My Name is Rock n' Roll"
 "System Victim"
 "Sirens"

References

Sweetnam, Skye